{{DISPLAYTITLE:C5H12O2}}
The molecular formula C5H12O2 (molar mass: 104.15 g/mol, exact mass: 104.0837 u) may refer to:

 2,2-Dimethoxypropane (DMP)
 Neopentyl glycol
 1,5-Pentanediol